Boitard is a surname. Notable people with the surname include:

François Boitard (1670– 1715), French artist
Louis Peter Boitard, French engraver and designer
Louise Boitard (1907–2001), French resistance member
Pierre Boitard (1787–1857), French botanist and geologist